VAX MACRO is the computer assembly language implementing the VAX instruction set architecture for the OpenVMS operating system, originally released by Digital Equipment Corporation (DEC) in 1977.

The syntax, directives, macro language, and lexical substitution operators of VAX MACRO formerly appeared in MACRO-11, the assembler for the PDP-11 series of computers. The MACRO-32 assembler supported the VAX processors developed and manufactured by DEC. It ran under the VMS operating system and produced object files suitable for the VMS linker. The MACRO-32 assembler and linker were bundled with the operating system. 

To port VMS to the DEC Alpha, VAX MACRO was implemented for the Alpha architecture. Since the Alpha used a different instruction set than the VAX, MACRO-32 was implemented as a compiler, compiling VAX assembly language into Alpha instructions. 

The Alpha AXP chips have their own native instruction set architecture, the OpenVMS assembler for Alpha assembly code is named MACRO-64.

A compiler from MACRO-32 is available for Intel Itanium architecture, and for x86-64.

References

External links
VSI OpenVMS VAX MACRO and Instruction Set Reference Manual
VSI OpenVMS MACRO Compiler Porting and User's Guide

Assembly languages
OpenVMS
OpenVMS software
Digital Equipment Corporation